WKVT-FM (92.7 FM, "Rewind 92.7 & 102.3") is a radio station licensed to serve Brattleboro, Vermont. The station is owned by the Monadnock Broadcasting Group subsidiary of Saga Communications and licensed to Saga Communications of New England, LLC. It airs a classic hits music format.

The station has been assigned these call letters by the Federal Communications Commission since September 12, 1979.

On December 19, 2016, WKVT-FM changed its format from classic hits to classic rock, branded as "Iconic Rock 92.7".

On March 23, 2018, WKVT-FM changed its format from classic rock to variety hits, branded as "92.7 Bratt FM".

The station also served as the Brattleboro area's New England Patriots' affiliate for NFL games until WINQ-AM took over.

On July 27, 2021, WKVT-FM changed its format from variety hits to classic hits, branded as "Rewind 92.7 & 102.3", adding a simulcast on WZBK 1220 AM/W272DZ 102.3 FM Keene, New Hampshire.

Translators
After having relayed WKVT (AM) for a while, W262CL 100.3 Brattleboro has been relaying WKVT-HD2 (which is, in turn, a simulcast of WKNE-HD2), since December 2018.

Previous logos

References

External links
WKVT-FM official website

Monadnock Broadcasting Group

KVT-FM
Classic hits radio stations in the United States
Radio stations established in 1980
1980 establishments in Vermont